L. Brad King is an American engineer.  He is the CEO and co-founder of Orbion Space Technologies, an aerospace company based in Houghton, MI, specializing in Hall-effect thrusters. He is also the CEO of Aerophysics Inc, a company based in Allouez, MI, providing "intelligence, surveillance, and reconnaissance" to the government. He is a Richard and Elizabeth Henes Endowed Professor for Space Systems in Mechanical Engineering-Engineering Mechanics at Michigan Technological University.

Biography 
A 1989 graduate of Calumet High School, King holds a Ph.D in Aerospace Engineering from the University of Michigan, and has served on numerous NASA, Department of Defense, and Intelligence Community advisory panels, and has published more than 100 papers on space propulsion systems. King is a 2003 recipient of the Presidential Early Career Award from President George W. Bush and selected as a recipient of the Society of Automotive Engineers Ralph R. Teetor Award for engineering educators in 2006.

Research interests 

King is a researcher investigating the field of "electric space propulsion systems, including Hall-effect thrusters, ion engines, and arcjets." King's research experience in the broader field of plasma physics includes such subjects as the design of the in-situ electrostatic probes, ion-energy analysis and time-of-flight mass spectrometry, Doppler laser cooling of trapped ions, optical flow diagnostics, and antimatter confinement. He holds patents for generating electrospray from a ferrofluid, self-regenerating nanotips for low-power electric propulsion cathodes, and a method and apparatus for improving efficiency of a Hall-effect thruster.

Select publications 

 Radiation-induced solidification of ionic liquid under extreme electric field (2016) Terhune, K.J., King, L.B., He, K., Cumings, J., Nanotechnology
 Performance Comparison Between a Magnesium- and Xenon-Fueled 2 Kilowatt Hall Thruster (2016) Hopkins, M.A. and King, L.B. Journal of Propulsion and Power
 Ionic liquid ferrofluid interface deformation and spray onset under electric and magnetic stresses (2014) B. A. Jackson, K. J. Terhune and L. B. King, Physics of Fluids

References

Living people
Year of birth missing (living people)
Place of birth missing (living people)
American aerospace engineers
University of Michigan alumni
Michigan Technological University faculty
American company founders